William Riker is a fictional character in the Star Trek universe.

William Riker may also refer to:
 William E. Riker (1873–1969), religious leader
 William H. Riker (1920–1993), political scientist

See also 
 William (disambiguation)
 Riker (disambiguation)